Sulwade Barrage Dam is an earthfill dam on the Tapi River near Shirpur, Dhule district in the state of Maharashtra, India.

Specifications

Purpose
 Irrigation

See also
 Dams in Maharashtra
 List of reservoirs and dams in India

References

Dams in Dhule district
Dams on the Tapti River
1999 establishments in Maharashtra